The Central District of Poldasht County is in West Azerbaijan province, Iran. At the National Census in 2006, the region's population (as a part of the former Poldasht District of Maku County) was 25,870 in 5,915 households. The following census in 2011 counted 28,022 people in 7,706 households, by which time the district had been separated from the county, Poldasht County established, and divided into two districts: the Central and Aras Districts. At the latest census in 2016, the district had 28,377 inhabitants in 7,741 households.

References 

Poldasht County

Districts of West Azerbaijan Province

Populated places in West Azerbaijan Province

Populated places in Poldasht County